In commutative algebra, an N-1 ring is an integral domain  whose integral closure in its quotient field is a finitely generated -module. A ring is called universally Japanese if every finitely generated integral domain over it is Japanese, and is called a Nagata ring, named for Masayoshi Nagata, or a pseudo-geometric ring if it is Noetherian and universally Japanese (or, which turns out to be the same, if it is Noetherian and all of its quotients by a prime ideal are N-2 rings). A ring is called geometric if it is the local ring of an algebraic variety or a completion of such a local ring , but this concept is not used much.

Examples

Fields and rings of polynomials or power series in finitely many indeterminates over fields are examples of Japanese rings. Another important example is a Noetherian integrally closed domain (e.g. a Dedekind domain) having a perfect field of fractions. On the other hand, a principal ideal domain or even a discrete valuation ring is not necessarily Japanese.

Any quasi-excellent ring is a Nagata ring, so in particular almost all Noetherian rings that occur in algebraic geometry are Nagata rings.

Here is an example of a discrete valuation ring that is not a Japanese ring. Choose a prime  and an infinite degree field extension  of a characteristic  field , such that . If  is any formal power series not in  then the ring  is not an N-1 ring (its integral closure is not a finitely generated module) so  is not a Japanese ring.

Also  has a cusp singularity at every closed point, so the set of singular points is not closed.

References

Bosch, Güntzer, Remmert, Non-Archimedean Analysis, Springer 1984, 

A. Grothendieck, J. Dieudonné, Eléments de géométrie algébrique, Ch. 0IV § 23, Publ. Math. IHES 20, (1964).
H. Matsumura, Commutative algebra , chapter 12.
Nagata, Masayoshi Local rings. Interscience Tracts in Pure and Applied Mathematics, No. 13 Interscience Publishers a division of John Wiley & Sons,New York-London 1962, reprinted by R. E. Krieger Pub. Co (1975)

External links 
http://stacks.math.columbia.edu/tag/032E

Algebraic geometry
Commutative algebra